Christian Fährmann (born 5 October 1975) is a former professional German football midfielder.

He represented Germany at the 1995 FIFA World Youth Championship.

References

External links 
 
 

1975 births
Living people
German footballers
Germany youth international footballers
Germany under-21 international footballers
Association football midfielders
Bundesliga players
2. Bundesliga players
Tennis Borussia Berlin players
Hertha BSC II players
Hertha BSC players
Karlsruher SC players
1. FC Union Berlin players
Fortuna Düsseldorf players
Hallescher FC players